Judy A. Sgro  (born December 16, 1944) is a Canadian politician. A member of the Liberal Party of Canada, she currently represents the electoral district of Humber River—Black Creek in the House of Commons of Canada. Sgro currently serves as the chair of the Standing Committee on International Trade and as a Chair on the Canadian House of Commons Liaison Committee since 2016.

Politics

Councillor
Sgro was introduced to politics when she was elected to North York City Council in 1987. In 1994 she was acclaimed as a Metro councillor for North York. In 1998 she became a Toronto city councillor in the newly amalgamated city where she served a term as vice-chair of the Toronto Police Services Board.

Federal politics

Government (1999–2006)
In 1997 Sgro's first attempt at Federal politics came up short when she tried to get elected in the riding of York South—Weston. She lost to John Nunziata, who was running as an independent, by 4,431 votes. In 1999 she won a by-election in York West to replace Sergio Marchi who had accepted an ambassadorial position to the World Trade Organization. She has since been re-elected by substantial pluralities.

In 2001, she was named chairperson of the Prime Minister's "Caucus Task Force on Urban Issues". In 2003 her group released an interim report recommending increased Federal support to recognize their economic and social value. From December 12, 2003 to January 13, 2005 Sgro served as Minister of Citizenship and Immigration in the government of Paul Martin.

Political favouritism issues

In November 2004, controversy began to surround Sgro as questions arose surrounding her activities during the June election earlier that year. Several members of her ministerial staff had filed expense claims to travel to and work in her riding throughout the campaign ending on election day. More serious claims were also raised when Opposition Conservative MPs claimed she had given a special immigration permit to a campaign supporter – specifically Alina Balaican, a Romanian who had initially been admitted to the country to work as a stripper. New Democratic Party MP Pat Martin also accused Sgro's aides of making threats to deny ministerial permits to his constituents if he criticized her on the stripper controversy. The press dubbed the issue "Strippergate".

On January 14, 2005, Sgro resigned from cabinet after further allegations that she had offered to intervene in the immigration hearing of Harjit Singh, a Brampton pizzeria owner, in exchange for free pizza for her campaign staff. The following day, the Toronto Star revealed that Singh had previously committed credit card fraud.

On January 31, 2005, Sgro filed a lawsuit against Singh for $750,000 in damages. On May 10, 2005, the Federal ethics commissioner Bernard Shapiro cleared Sgro of all wrongdoing from the Strippergate debacle when it was found that Sgro didn't know that two staffers had put her in a position of conflict of interest. The ethics commissioner also concluded that Sgro had never met the woman or even knew that she had volunteered on her re-election campaign. Shapiro said to Sgro, "It appears you acted appropriately." Also the same day, Singh retracted his allegations and apologized to Sgro. He said, "I now admit I did not have a meeting with Judy Sgro and at no time did she request any campaign assistance from me. Nor did she help me with my immigration problems."

Sgro was the first member of Cabinet to resign from Paul Martin's government. There was some speculation in the media that fellow minister Joe Volpe helped to engineer her resignation given that they had a cool relationship.

Expenses issue
In June 2010 it was revealed that Sgro had been claiming expenses for rent on an Ottawa luxury highrise condominium owned by her adult children, violating rules for such expenses set by the Board of Internal Economy of the House of Commons. Sgro had paid $138,000 to purchase the condo in 2001, and then transferred the title on the property to her children in 2006; she then paid her children $22,000 a year in rent to live in the apartment, violating rules forbidding MPs from claiming expenses on goods or services contracted from family members.

Asked about this controversy in 2013 by a reporter from Québecor Média, Sgro replied, "The issue was dealt with, an issue was pointed out... I immediately dealt with the issue and I would ask the prime minister and his folks to do the same thing. Thank you very much."

Opposition (2006–2015)
Sgro served as the Opposition Critic for Industry for the Liberals. On November 1, 2010, the Liberals released a white paper providing recommendations for retirement income security followed by a Pension Income Bill of Rights. The paper was created by a working group co-chaired by Sgro.

On March 4, 2014, Sgro was re-nominated by acclamation as the Liberal candidate for the renamed riding of Humber River—Black Creek for the next federal election.  She subsequently won election to this seat.

Government (2015–present)
Sgro currently serves as the chair of the Standing Committee on International Trade. She was re-elected in the 2019 federal election.

Personal life
She and her husband Sam Sgro are the parents of three children. Judy's daughter, Deanna Sgro, was a candidate for the Ontario Liberal Party during the 2018 Ontario general election, as well as the 2018 Toronto municipal election for Humber River-Black Creek.

Election results

References

External links
 
 

1944 births
21st-century Canadian women politicians
Canadian monarchists
Canadian people of Italian descent
Liberal Party of Canada MPs
Living people
Members of the 27th Canadian Ministry
Members of the House of Commons of Canada from Ontario
Members of the King's Privy Council for Canada
People from Moncton
People from Thornhill, Ontario
Toronto city councillors
Women government ministers of Canada
Women in Ontario politics
Women members of the House of Commons of Canada
Women municipal councillors in Canada